Hans Schönenberger (born 30 December 1926) is a Swiss former sports shooter. He competed in the 50 metre rifle, three positions and 50 metre rifle, prone events at the 1960 Summer Olympics.

References

External links
 

1926 births
Possibly living people
Swiss male sport shooters
Olympic shooters of Switzerland
Shooters at the 1960 Summer Olympics
Sportspeople from the canton of St. Gallen